The Prince George's County Police Department (PGPD) is the primary law enforcement agency in Prince George's County, Maryland in the United States, servicing a population of over 900,000 residents and visitors within 498 square miles (1,290 km2) of jurisdiction.

The department headquarters is in the Palmer Park area of Landover, a census-designated place.

History 

The Prince George's County Police Department was created on June 1, 1931, in response to the increasing population and crime the county was experiencing. Prior to 1931, the county was primarily policed by the Prince George's County Sheriff's Office (PGSO). When serious crimes, such as murder or rape, were committed, detectives from the Baltimore City Police Department were borrowed.

On June 26, 1978, Officer Albert Marshal Claggett IV and Officer James Swart were shot and killed with Claggett's revolver by Terrence Johnson (February 27, 1963 - February 27, 1997), a 15-year-old theft suspect, while in the booking area of the Hyattsville District Station. Johnson was found guilty of manslaughter in the death of Officer Claggett and not guilty by reason of insanity in the death of Officer Swart. Johnson was sentenced to 25 years in prison; he was paroled in 1995. on February 27, 1997, Johnson and his brother Darryl robbed a bank in Aberdeen, Maryland. As police officers approached to arrest him, Johnson committed suicide on his 34th birthday.

On February 8, 1982, Officer Raymond Hubbard was shot and killed when he intervened in an armed robbery while off duty at Iverson Mall. While shopping at the mall Officer Hubbard observed an armed robbery in progress at a jewelry store. He drew his weapon and confronted the suspects. Unbeknownst to Officer Hubbard, there were accomplices nearby who opened fire on him. Officer Hubbard was struck several times and fell to the ground. The suspects then stood over him and shot him several more times before stealing his service revolver. All four suspects were eventually apprehended and convicted of Officer Hubbard's murder. Three were sentenced to life and one was sentenced to 70 years in prison. Officer Hubbard had served with the Prince George's County Police Department for 2 years and previously served for the U.S. Air Force from 1975 to 1979.

In August 1988, Corporal Mark Kevin Murphy was shot while he attempted to force open a door during a drug raid. As Murphy knelt down to position equipment, someone inside the home opened the door. Murphy's partner and childhood best friend, Cpl. Gary Sommers, then opened fire hitting Murphy in the back of the head.

Around 1988 when the Maryland State Police went to Beretta, the Prince George's County Police Department started to replace their revolvers with the 9mm Beretta 92.

During the late 1990s, the PGPD used the Chevrolet Lumina.
 
In July 1999, the department was subject to a complaint by the United States Department of Justice (DOJ) regarding alleged excessive use of force by police canine units.

In January 2004, the department signed a Memorandum of Agreement (MOA) with the U.S. Department of Justice over allegations of excessive force. This resulted in the establishment of an independent monitoring group by Military Professional Resources Inc. (MPRI), a defense contractor.

On June 21, 2005, Sergeant Steven F. Gaughan was killed during a traffic stop in Laurel.

On June 27, 2008, Corporal Richard S. Findley was killed by Ronnie L. White, who was driving a stolen pickup truck. White struck Corporal Findley with the truck as he attempted to elude police and avoid being arrested in Laurel. White appeared to be in good physical condition when he was arrested but died of asphyxiation while in the custody of the Prince George's County Department of Corrections. The death was ruled a homicide.  The Prince George's County Police investigated the crime; suspects included several guards. A cell video camera, which would have recorded the incident was either disabled or obstructed. There were no arrests.

On July 29, 2008, the PGCPD, together with the Prince George's County Sheriff's Office, raided the residence of the Mayor of Berwyn Heights. The mayor was cleared of wrongdoing, while the police were heavily criticized for their actions.

On October 23, 2008, the county and three individually named police officers were found not liable for use of excessive force by a jury after deliberating for twenty minutes.   The claim involved injuries sustained by a University of Maryland student who was involved in a riot following a victory over Duke University in basketball in 2005.  The student was struck near the eye allegedly by a projectile fired from a FN 303 less-than-lethal riot gun.

On March 9, 2010, Private First Class Tom Jensen died at Prince George's Hospital Center after being taken there following a vehicular crash. He was responding to a man breaking into a woman's apartment on February 27, 2010. Due to his over five years of service in the department, he was posthumously promoted to corporal.

On October 9, 2010, an instructor at the Prince George's Police Academy, was transferred out of the academy. Reportedly, he had given all of his recruits perfect scores on tests, even though students' actual scores varied, and at least some students had failed those exams. There was evidence that he shared exam questions with students in advance, allowing several classes of recruits to graduate after cheating on their exams.

On February 3, 2012, Corporal Donald Taylor allegedly struck Ryan Dorm with the butt of his service weapon. The pistol fired from the impact with Dorm's face. Taylor then allegedly filed a report falsely claiming Dorm had somehow attacked him. A surveillance video at the Brentwood, Maryland gas station showed this to be false and in September 2012, Taylor was charged with second-degree assault, reckless endangerment, providing a false statement to police and misconduct in office. Dorm, who had been arrested on various charges had all charges against dropped after being jailed for four months. Cpl Donald Taylor was charged with assault and misconduct in office. He was found not guilty and acquitted of all charges after a trial.

In May 2012, Officer Daniel Gonzalez was arrested for driving under the influence of alcohol after crashing his official car. Gonzalez was found not guilty of all charges after a trial.

In July 2012, Corporal Rickey Adey was indicted by a grand jury on charges of assaulting a teenaged boy during an arrest. Adey was acquitted of the charges after a trial.

On August 20, 2012, Officer Adrian Morris died as a result of an automobile accident on the Washington, D.C. Capital Beltway, near Route 212. Officer Michael Risher was also injured but survived, according to the police department. Morris, who was driving the police cruiser, was attempting to catch up to another vehicle while investigating a reported crime. The police cruiser apparently veered off the highway and into a ravine. Morris, who was thrown from the vehicle, suffered severe head injuries. He was pronounced dead at Prince George's Hospital. Morris, 23, was a former member of the Prince George's Police Explorers.

In April 2014, Officer Sinisa Simic was sentenced to ten years' confinement for his protection of a gang distributing cocaine and untaxed cigarettes. Simic had been indicted on various charges in 2010 as part of a wide-ranging corruption investigation that lead to the arrest of three other officers.

In March 2021, the department hired Dallas law enforcement veteran Malik Aziz as its new chief of police. The previous chief, Hank Stawinski, resigned on June 18, 2020, following a report that found widespread patterns of racism throughout the department.

Organization

The current Chief of Police is Malik Aziz, who is the 19th chief. The previous Chief of Police, Hank Stawinski, resigned in 2020.

As of 2010, the agency has an authorized strength of 1,786 sworn officers and 317 civilians.

The agency is divided into eight districts. Each district is divided into sectors, which are divided into individual beats:
 District I (Hyattsville: Adam and Baker sector),
 District II  (Bowie: David and Edward sector),
 District III (Palmer Park: George sector),
 District IV  (Oxon Hill: John and King sector),
 District V   (Clinton: Frank sector), 
 District VI  (Beltsville: Charlie sector)
 District VII (Fort Washington: William sector)
 District VIII (Forestville: Henry sector)

Organizational structure
 Bureau of Administration
 Bureau of Patrol
 Bureau of Investigation
 Bureau of Forensic Science and Intelligence

Specialized units
As of January 1, 2014, each division has various units in it as listed below.

Bureau of Patrol
 Patrol Squads/shifts
 Special Assignment Teams
 COPS Squads (Community Oriented Policing Services)
 Bicycle Patrol Trained Officers

Regional Investigative Division

Divided into 3 regions
North (Hyattsville/Beltsville), Central (Bowie/Landover), South (Clinton, Oxon HIll)
Each region has its own detectives:
Robbery Suppression Team Detectives
Property Crimes Section Detectives
Crimes Against Persons Detectives

Special Operations Division
 Emergency Services Team (SWAT)
 Canine Unit (K-9)
 Traffic Enforcement Unit
 Collision Analysis and Reconstruction Unit
 Motors Unit
 Marine Unit
 Honor Guard
 Conflict Negotiator Team
 Civil Disturbance Unit
 Special Events Planning Section
 Automated Enforcement Division
 National Harbor Unit
 Aviation Unit - operates four MD520N helicopters.

Criminal Investigation Division

 Homicide Unit
 Commercial Robbery Unit
 Sex Crimes Section
 Child & Vulnerable Adult Abuse Section
 Domestic Violence Unit

Crime Scene Investigation Division
 Evidence Section
 DNA Analysis Lab
 Firearms Examination Unit
 Drug Analysis Lab - 
 Computer Data Recovery Unit

Special Investigation Division 
 Washington Area Vehicle Enforcement Team/Auto Theft Task Force
 GANG Unit
 Pawn Unit
 Commercial Retail Theft Investigation Unit
 Scrap/Precious Metals Investigation Unit
 Violent Crime Impact Section/ VCU
 Environmental Crimes Unit
 Financial Crimes Unit
 ROPE

Internal Affairs Division 

 Internal Affairs
 Special Investigative Response Team
 Administrative Hearing Board Unit
 Court Liaison Unit

Narcotics Enforcement Division
 Major Narcotics Section
 Street Narcotics Section

Bureau of Support Services
 Recruitment and Selection Unit 
 Training & Education Division - Academy
 Technology Integration Section
 Clothing & Supply Unit
 Property Management Division
 Records Section
 Community Services Division
 Professional Compliance Section
 Intelligence Division

Uniform and Rank Structure

Uniform 
The uniform of a PGPD officer consists of a light grey uniform shirt with PGPD patch on the sleeve, French blue pants with a black stripe, black shoes or boots, and a French blue 8 point cover. When wearing the winter uniform of the day a black tie is worn over a long sleeve uniform shirt.  Alternatively, PGPD officers are giving the option to wear a utility uniform on patrol consisting of navy blue pants and shirt. Officers assigned to the Special Operations Division, Emergency Services Team (SWAT) are authorized to wear green utility uniforms. Badges and nameplates are gold, and all officers between the ranks of officer first class and sergeant have blue chevrons with a grey outline on each sleeve. Officers from the ranks of lieutenant to police chief wear a white shirt with gold rank insignia on the collars. The dress uniform consists the light grey shirt (white for commissioned officers), French blue pants, hi-gloss shoes, the French blue 8 point cover, and a dark blue dress blouse with French blue epaulets, pocket flaps, and piping around the sleeve.

Rank Structure 
The following is the rank precedence of sworn personnel in descending order:

 Chief of Police 
 Assistant Chief of Police 
 Deputy Chief 
 Major 
 Captain 
 Lieutenant 
 Sergeant 
 Corporal 
 Police Officer First Class 
 Police Officer

Fleet and Weapons 

The department's fleet consists primarily of the Ford Police Interceptor Utility and Sedan, the Chevrolet Tahoe is also used, with the Ford Crown Victoria Police Interceptor and Chevrolet Impala 9C1 being phased out. The department's service pistol is the Smith & Wesson M&P 40, chambered in .40 Caliber. AR-15 patrol rifles and shotguns are also used.

See also 

 Prince George's County Sheriff's Office
 List of law enforcement agencies in Maryland
 Berwyn Heights, Maryland mayor's residence drug raid

References

External links
Official website*

1931 establishments in Maryland
County police departments of Maryland
Prince George's County, Maryland